The 2015 Nebraska Cornhuskers football team represented the University of Nebraska in the 2015 NCAA Division I FBS football season. The team was coached by first-year head coach Mike Riley and played their home games at Memorial Stadium in Lincoln, Nebraska. They were members of the West Division of the Big Ten Conference.

Nebraska struggled with many close losses in the 2015 season and finished the regular season with a 5–7 overall record, but was able to hand a playoff-bound and Big Ten champion Michigan State team their only loss of the regular season. Nebraska still qualified for a bowl game, one of three teams to do so with a 5–7 record (the others being in-conference rival Minnesota and San Jose State). This was due to the lack of six-wins teams to fill the 80 bowl slots in the FBS and because of their APR score in relation to other FBS teams that also had a 5–7 record. The Huskers took on the UCLA Bruins in the Foster Farms Bowl in Santa Clara, California and won 37–29 to end the season with a 6–7 record.

Before the season

Recruiting

Scholarship recruits

Walk-on recruits

Schedule

Roster and coaching staff

Depth chart

Game summaries

BYU

Sources:

BYU snapped Nebraska's 29-game season-opening winning streak on a last-second 42-yard Hail Mary pass from backup quarterback Tanner Mangum to Mitch Mathews.  This was Nebraska's first season opening loss since 1985.  BYU outgained Nebraska in total offense 511 yards to 445 yards.  Nebraska was led by Tommy Armstrong who went 24-of-41 through the air for 319 yards with three touchdown passes and 1 interception.  Terrell Newby was the team's leading rusher with 46 yards on 10 carries and a touchdown and Jordan Westerkamp was the top Husker receiver with seven catches for 107 yards and a touchdown.  Taysom Hill was 21-of-34 for 268 yards with a touchdown and an interception before being knocked out of the game.  His backup, Tanner Mangum was 7-of-11 for 111 yards with the game-winning hail mary touchdown pass.  Hill was the leading Cougar rusher with 83 yards and two scores and Nick Kurtz was the top BYU receiver with five catches for 123 yards.

BYU Game starters

South Alabama

Sources:

Nebraska used a balanced offensive effort and a stingy defense to put together four solid quarters of football in a 48–9 victory over South Alabama on Saturday night.  Junior I-Back Terrell Newby raced to career highs with 28 carries for 198 yards and two touchdowns on the night, he also hauled in two catches for 38 yards and another score in the win.  Tommy Armstrong was 21-of-30 for 270 yards and two scores.  Nebraska totaled 561 yards of offense in the game with 258 yards on the ground and 303 in the air.  The Huskers held South Alabama to 332 total yards, with 313 through the air and limiting the Jaguars to just 19 total yards rushing.

South Alabama Game starters

Miami (FL)

Sources:

Tommy Armstrong Jr. and the Huskers orchestrated a fourth-quarter comeback, erasing a 23-point deficit in the final 8:36 of regulation, but Miami escaped with a 36–33 overtime win on Saturday at Sun Life Stadium. Trailing 33–10 after Miami's Michael Badgley connected on his fourth field goal of the game. Armstrong led Nebraska to 23 unanswered points to send the game to overtime tied at 33. Nebraska's comeback included a trio of fourth quarter touchdown passes from Armstrong to Alonzo Moore, Brandon Reilly and Stanley Morgan Jr., and a pair of two point conversion passes to Jordan Westerkamp and Cethan Carter. In overtime Armstrong opened the extra period with an interception on the first play. Miami took over and kicked a 28-yard field goal to end the game. Armstrong ended the day going 21-of-45 for 309 yards with 4 TDs and 3 INTs. Terrell Newby was the top Husker rusher with 14 carries for 82 yards and Jordan Westerkamp led Nebraska's receivers with five catches for 95 yards and a touchdown.  The Huskers gained 462 yards in the game and allowed 511 to the Hurricanes.  Nebraska fell to 1–2 for the first time since 1981.

Miami Game starters

Southern Miss

Sources:

Tommy Armstrong, Drew Brown, Andy Janovich, Brandon Reilly and Jordan Westerkamp all produced career days to lead Nebraska to a 36–28 win over Southern Miss on Homecoming at Memorial Stadium.  Brown tied an NCAA record by kicking five field goals in the first half to help Nebraska jump to a 22–0 halftime lead. He also tied the Memorial Stadium record for field goals made in a game. Westerkamp notched a career-high with 11 receptions for 118 yards and Reilly notched a career-high with 112 yards.  Andy Janovich notched career highs rushing and receiving from the fullback position and Tommy Armstrong notched a career-high with 431 yards of total offense. The Husker defense for the fourth game this year allowed 300+ yards passing as Southern Miss threw for over 400 yards. The Golden Eagles mounted a comeback in the second half, but came up short as the Huskers held on for the 36–28 win to end the non-conference season.

Southern Miss Game starters

Illinois

Sources:*Sources:

For the fourth time in five contests, the outcome of Nebraska's game was not decided until the opponent's final offensive play, and for the third time, Nebraska walked away on the short end of the stick with a 14–13 loss to Illinois to open the Big Ten season.  The game was decided on a one-yard touchdown pass from Wes Lunt to Geronimo Allison with 10 seconds remaining to complete the Illini's 13-point fourth quarter deficit.  Nebraska gained 292 yards on the day, and allowed 382 yards.  Tommy Armstrong had his worst passing day of the year, going 10-of-31 for 105 yards with an interception in the loss.  Linebacker Chris Weber led the Blackshirts with a career-high 17 tackles, with three tackles for loss.

Illinois Game starters

Wisconsin

Sources:*Sources:

For the fourth time this season, Nebraska lost a game in the final seconds on the opponent's last offensive possession as Wisconsin kicked a 46-yard field goal with 0:04 remaining to seal a 23–21 win in Lincoln.  With the loss, Nebraska drops to 2–4 for the first time since 1959.  It is the seventh time in the last eight Nebraska games that the outcome has been decided by a single score.  Wisconsin outgained the Huskers 469 yards (147 rush, 322 pass) to 325 yards (196 rush, 129 pass).  Tommy Armstrong was 11-of-28 for 129 yards with a touchdown pass.  Andy Janovich had three carries for 59 yards and a touchdown and Terrell Newby had 15 carries for 59 yards to lead the rushers, while Tommy Armstrong had 50 yards on eight carries and a score.  Alonzo Moore was the top receiver with one catch for 41 yards and the touchdown.  Byerson Cockrell lead the team in tackles with 10.

Wisconsin Game starters

Minnesota

Sources:*Sources:

Nebraska clinched their first Big Ten victory under Mike Riley with a 48–25 win over Minnesota in Minneapolis. Nebraska jumped to a 17–7 lead and then scored 21 unanswered to secure the win.  Tommy Armstrong was 18-of-26 for 261 yards and had eight carries for 38 yards to lead the Huskers. Terrell Newby rushed 13 times for 116 yards and a pair of touchdowns in the win with the Huskers gaining 464 total yards of offense while Blackshirts held Minnesota to 366 yards and forced three turnovers.

Minnesota Game starters

Northwestern

Sources:

In another game that went down to the wire, Nebraska watched a two-point conversion attempt fall incomplete with 4:23 left, allowing Northwestern to escape Memorial Stadium with a 30–28 win.  With Nebraska's fifth loss of the season by five or fewer points, the Huskers slip to 3–5 overall and 1–3 in the Big Ten.  Nebraska's five losses have come by a total of 13 points.  Nebraska outgained Northwestern in total offense 373 yards (291 pass, 82 rush) to 333 yards (177 pass, 156 rush).  Tommy Armstrong was 24-of-48 for 291 yards with 1 TD and 1 INT in the loss.  Terrell Newby was the top rusher with 16 carries for 53 yards and Jordan Westerkamp the top receiver with five catches for 92 yards.

Northwestren Game starters

Purdue

Sources:

Nebraska turned the ball over five times and suffered a 55–45 loss to Purdue at Ross-Ade Stadium. The Huskers slipped to 3–6 overall and 1–4 in the Big Ten. Ryker Fyfe made his first career start at quarterback in place of injured starter Tommy Armstrong and threw for 407 yards and four touchdowns despite also throwing four interceptions and losing one fumble. The five turnovers were converted into 28 points by the Boilermakers. The Huskers were also without receivers Alonzo Moore and De'Moarnay Pierson-El and running back Terrell Newby to injury as well. Nebraska outgained Purdue in total offense with 484 total yards compared to Purdue's 457 yards. Nebraska rallied with 29 fourth quarter points, the second-best point total in the quarter in school history, trailing only 30 points scored at Hawaii in December 1982. Jordan Westerkamp hauled in nine passes for 123 yards and a touchdown in the loss to help lead the Huskers. The loss marked the 1st time in Huskers football history that they lost 6 games before the start of November.

Purdue Game starters

Michigan State

Sources:

Nebraska scored two touchdowns in the final 1:47 of the game to rally for a 39–38 upset over #7 ranked Michigan State.  The Huskers' 12-point rally in the fourth quarter tied for the largest fourth quarter rally in school history.  Nebraska outgained MSU in total offense 499 yards to 491 yards.  Tommy Armstrong finished the day going 19-of-33 for 320 yards with 2 TDs and 2 INTs. He also added 19 yards rushing and two scores on the ground.  Imani Cross had 18 carries for 98 yards and a touchdown while Jordan Westerkamp had the top day for the receivers with 9 catches for 143 yards and a touchdown.  Brandon Reilly added three catches for 87 yards and the game-winning touchdown.  It was the first time an unranked Nebraska team beat a Top 10 ranked opponent since 1977.

Michigan State Game starters

Rutgers

Sources:

Nebraska jumped out to a 21–0 lead and never looked back in a 31–14 victory over Rutgers at High Point Solutions Stadium.  The Huskers wasted little time, marking 78 yards in eight plays to score on the game's opening drive.  The Blackshirt defense played its most complete game of the year, coming up with six sacks, 10 tackles for loss and 2 interceptions in the win.  The Huskers held the Scarlet Knights to just 259 yards of offense.  Nebraska gained 362 total yards on the day (174 rush, 188 pass).  Tommy Armstrong was 14-of-21 for 188 yards with 3 TD passes and 3 INT.  Cethan Carter was the top receiver with four catches for 57 yards and a touchdown while Imani Cross led the Huskers on the ground with 20 carries for 94 yards.

Rutgers Game starters

Iowa

Sources:

Despite outgaining Iowa in total yardage, time of possession and plays run, the Hawkeyes held on for a 28–20 win over Nebraska in the HyVee Heroes Game on Black Friday.  Nebraska's defense held Iowa to 0-of-9 on third downs, but four interceptions by the Huskers and untimely penalties doomed Nebraska.  Nebraska outgained Iowa 433 yards (296 pass, 137 rush) to 250 yards (97 pass, 153 rush).  Tommy Armstrong was 25-of-45 for 296 yards with 4 INT.  Imani Cross was the leading rusher with 19 carries for 58 yards and two TDs.  Terrell Newby had a team-high five receptions for 22 yards in the loss, while Cethan Carter caught four passes for a team-high 76 yards.

Iowa Game starters

Foster Farms Bowl

Sources:

Tommy Armstrong threw and ran for touchdowns to help Nebraska cap its season on a bright note with a 37–29 win over UCLA in the Foster Farms Bowl.  Nebraska scored 30 straight points after falling behind 21–7 early on.  The Huskers rushed for a season-high 326 yards (151 in the third quarter alone) in the win and ended the game plus-one in turnover margin.  Armstrong ended the night going 12-of-19 for 174 yards with a touchdown pass and added 76 yards rushing on 10 carries with a score on the ground.  Freshman Devine Ozigbo led all rushers with 20 carries for 80 yards.  Jordan Westerkamp was the top receiver for Nebraska with two catches for 44 yards. For his effort, Tommy Armstrong was named Offensive MVP of the Foster Farms Bowl.  Also, head coach Mike Riley became the first coach to win this bowl game twice, after also having won the game in (2007)

UCLA Game starters

Big Ten awards

Player of the Week Honors

All Conference Honors

2015 Big Ten All-Conference Honors

NFL Draft
 Maliek Collins (DT, 3rd Round, 67th pick, Dallas Cowboys)
 Vincent Valentine (DT, 3rd Round, 96th pick, New England Patriots)
 Alex Lewis (OT, 4th Round, 130th pick, Baltimore Ravens)
 Andy Janovich (FB, 6th Round, 176th pick, Denver Broncos)

Rankings

References

Nebraska
Nebraska Cornhuskers football seasons
Redbox Bowl champion seasons
Nebraska Cornhuskers football